The Andorran Workers' Union is a Trade union in the Principality of Andorra. It was established in 1990, and claimed several hundred members. Its current status is unknown.

References

Trade unions in Andorra
Trade unions established in 1990